Jon Christoffer Sundby  (born 26 September 1978) is a Norwegian sailor. 

He received a gold medal in the Europe class at the 1997 world championships.

He competed at the 2000 Summer Olympics in Sydney together with Vegard Arnhoff, where they finished thirteenth in the 49er class. At the 2004 Summer Olympics in Athens he competed together with Frode Bovim, finishing fourth in the 49er class.

References

External links
 
 
 

1978 births
Living people
Norwegian male sailors (sport)
Olympic sailors of Norway
Sailors at the 2000 Summer Olympics – 49er
Sailors at the 2004 Summer Olympics – 49er
Europe class world champions
World champions in sailing for Norway